Foley Room Recorded Live in Brussels was the second Solid Steel album by Amon Tobin, recorded in Brussels at the Ancienne Belgique in 2007 and released as a free download in November 2008. According to Tobin's official website, "After months of back and forth and despite everyone’s best efforts the mix was in danger of being edited into the ground to accommodate big labels and publishers. Rather than release a compromised version commercially, the decision was made to give it away for free instead"

Track listing
 [Amon Tobin]    In The Dark Intro 
 [Amon Tobin]   Horsefish Live Mix 
 [Cardiacs]    The Alphabet Business Concern (Home Of Fadeless Splendour) 
 [Two Fingers]    Two Fingers (Instrumental) 
 [Spank Rock]     Bump Switch Rmx 
 [Two Fingers]    That Girl (Instrumental) 
 [Amon Tobin]     Esthers 
 [Amon Tobin]     Throwback Intro To SSLive1 
 [King Cannibal]  Aragami Style 
 [Kelis]          Aww Shit 
 [Two Fingers]    Two Fingers (White Label) 
 [Amon Tobin]     Kitchen Sink Live Mix 
 [Amon Tobin]     Big Furry Head 
 [Tech Itch]      Know 
 [Amon Tobin]     Verbal Acc 
 [Two Fingers]    High Life (Instrumental) 
 [Boxcutter]      Grub 
 [Autechre]       Doctrine 
 [Amon Tobin]     Foley Room 
 [Amon Tobin]     Overwhelming Forces 
 [Dom & Roland]   Ritual 
 [Amon Tobin & Noisia]   Sunhammer VIP
 [Konflict]       Mesiah (Noisia Rmx)  
 [Spank Rock]     Get On The Floor (Disco D) 
 [Nice Nice]      Uh-Oh 
 [Amon Tobin]     Straight Psyche 
 [Autechre]       Second Bad Vilbel 
 [Noisia]         B.R.E.E.Z.E. 
 [Noisia]         Concussion 
 [Kryptic Minds & Leon Switch]   No Remorse 
 [Amon Tobin]     Keep Your Distance

References

External links
Foley Room Recorded Live at Discogs

Amon Tobin albums
DJ mix albums
2008 live albums
2008 compilation albums